Jake Gyllenhaal is an American actor and producer who has appeared in over 35 motion pictures (including some yet to be released), three television programs, one commercial, and four music videos. He made his film debut in 1991 with a minor role in the comedy-drama City Slickers. In 1993, he appeared in A Dangerous Woman, a motion picture adaptation directed by Gyllenhaal's father Stephen Gyllenhaal and co-written by his mother Naomi Foner that was based on the novel of the same name by Mary McGarry Morris. In the following year, he portrayed Robin Williams' son in an episode of the police procedural television series Homicide: Life on the Street; the episode was directed by his father. In 1999, Gyllenhaal starred in the Joe Johnston-directed drama October Sky; the film was received warmly by critics, and Gyllenhaal's portrayal of the NASA engineer Homer Hickam was praised.

In 2001, he appeared in the comedy film Bubble Boy, which was a critical failure and a box office bomb but has since gone on to attain status as a "cult comedy". Later that same year, he starred in the Richard Kelly-directed drama Donnie Darko alongside his sister Maggie, and Drew Barrymore. His portrayal of the Donnie Darko character, a "sullen" and "schizophrenic" teenager, made him a cult hero. Although the film was critically acclaimed, it failed commercially. Gyllenhaal starred in the 2004 disaster film The Day After Tomorrow, which, despite receiving mixed reviews from critics, was a commercial success at the box office. In 2005, he co-starred as Jack Twist opposite Heath Ledger in the romance drama Brokeback Mountain. The actors portrayed two men that fall in love during a sheepherding expedition. The roles earned both Gyllenhaal and Ledger critical acclaim and Academy Award nominations. That same year, he starred in the drama films Jarhead and Proof.

Gyllenhaal played the true-crime author Robert Graysmith in the 2007 mystery film Zodiac. Directed by David Fincher, the film explores the story about the serial killer Zodiac who stalked the Bay Area during the late 1960s and early 1970s. In 2010, he portrayed Prince Dastan in the fantasy adventure Prince of Persia: The Sands of Time; the film received mixed reviews from critics and was a box office success. That same year, Gyllenhaal starred alongside Anne Hathaway in the romantic comedy Love & Other Drugs. He portrayed Colter Stevens, a U.S. Army Aviation captain, in the 2011 sci-fi time-travel thriller Source Code. In 2013, Gyllenhaal starred in the drama Prisoners together with Hugh Jackman; the film received both critical and commercial success. The following year, he starred in dual roles in  Enemy. He then produced and starred in Nightcrawler (2014). In 2019, Gyllenhaal played Marvel Comics character Mysterio in Spider-Man: Far From Home, set within the Marvel Cinematic Universe.

Film

Producer

Television

Stage

Music videos

See also 

 List of awards and nominations received by Jake Gyllenhaal

References

External links 
 
Jake Gyllenhaal at Rotten Tomatoes
Jake Gyllenhaal at AllMovie

Male actor filmographies
American filmographies